

Portugal
 Angola – 
 António de Lencastre, Governor of Angola (1772–1779)
 José Gonçalo da Gama, Governor of Angola (1779–1782)
 Macau – Jose Vicente da Silveira Meneses, Governor of Macau (1778–1780)

Colonial governors
Colonial governors
1779